Office National is an Australian network of independent office supply stores. It is the dealer brand of Office Brands, and the name dates back to 1999, with the formation of Office National Limited (which later became Office Brands). The head office is located in Pymble, a suburb of Sydney, NSW, Australia.

History 
Office Brands began as Office National Limited, which was formed by a merger between Office Force, Office Network, and A.P.T.

The company later launched two brands in Australia: Office Products Depot in 2003, and O-Net in 2009, a white-label brand that allowed for smaller independent stores to operate under the larger company without losing their existing brand. 

Office National Limited underwent a name change in 2009, becoming Office Brands to reflect the two new additions to the company. The dealer brand became known as Office National from then on, retaining the name from the 1999 merger and adopting the slogan “Above & Beyond.”

Business and products

Office National primarily sells general office supplies, but also other office-related goods such as furniture and promotional materials. Locations also typically offer custom printing.

Achievements
Office National’s parent company, Office Brands, is the largest independent office supply group in Australia.

Office National did well in recent Stationery News Reseller and Supplier of the Year Awards. The 2016 winner in the metropolitan category was Office National Canning Vale, and the list of finalists for the 2017 awards includes five Office National locations.

See also

List of companies of Australia

References

External links
Office National
Office Brands

Retail companies established in 1999
Consumer electronics retailers of Australia
1999 establishments in Australia